Cophixalus kaindiensis is a species of frog in the family Microhylidae.
It is endemic to Papua New Guinea.
Its natural habitat is subtropical or tropical moist montane forests.
It is threatened by habitat loss.

References

Sources

kaindiensis
Amphibians of Papua New Guinea
Taxonomy articles created by Polbot
Amphibians described in 1979